The 1979 Macdonald Brier, the Canadian men's curling championship was held from March 4 to 10, 1979 at the Ottawa Civic Centre in Ottawa, Ontario. For the second straight year, the total attendance for the week set a then-record where 89,081 attended the event. This was the last Brier where the round robin would determine the champion without a playoff.

Team Manitoba, who was skipped by Barry Fry captured the Brier tankard as they finished round robin play with a 10–1 record as they clinched the title with after the Friday night draw. This was Manitoba's twentieth title and the only Brier won by Fry. The Fry rink would go onto represent Canada at the 1979 Air Canada Silver Broom, the men's world curling championship in Bern, Switzerland where they lost in the semifinal to eventual champion Norway.

It would be the last Brier under the sponsorship of Macdonald Tobacco. This marked an end of an era, as Macdonald Tobacco had sponsored the event since the first Brier in 1927. Following the final draw, the head of Macdonald Tobacco, David Macdonald Stewart declared "[f]or half a century, Macdonald Tobacco has followed an idea ... a dream to ... bring together Canadians, from all parts of the country and all walks of life, in a national sporting event. Curling was the ideal sport. It's been a wonderful experience. We've now seen the final chapter in 50 years of Canadian history". To commemorate the end of the Macdonald era, every living Brier champion skip at the time were invited to attend the Brier, and had their picture taken together. The lone surviving curler from the 1927 Brier, Emmet Smith (Northern Ontario) was also invited. The group of skips gathered before the final draw of the event for a special ceremony.

The event was marred with slow ice conditions and bad rocks, which were borrowed from a local curling club. The rocks were mismatched and pitted which "reduced shotmaking to a guessing game." Part way through the week, organizers asked for the teams to vote on changing the rocks. The teams that favoured hitting, including the leading Manitoba rink opposed changing the rocks, as the mismatched rocks made draw shots more difficult than hit shots.

Teams
The teams were listed as follows:

Round Robin standings
Final Round Robin standings

Round Robin results
All draw times are listed in Eastern Standard Time (UTC−05:00)

Draw 1
Sunday, March 4, 2:00 pm

Draw 2
Sunday, March 4, 7:30 pm

Draw 3
Monday, March 5, 9:30 am

Draw 4
Monday, March 5, 2:00 pm

Draw 5
Monday, March 5, 7:30 pm

Draw 6
Tuesday, March 6, 9:00 am

Draw 7
Tuesday, March 6, 2:00 pm

Draw 8
Wednesday, March 7, 2:00 pm

Draw 9
Wednesday, March 7, 7:30 pm

Draw 10
Thursday, March 8, 2:00 pm

Draw 11
Thursday, March 8, 7:30 pm

Draw 12
Friday, March 9, 2:00 pm

Draw 13
Friday, March 9, 7:30 pm

Draw 14
Saturday, March 10, 1:30 pm

Awards

All-Star Team 
The media selected the following curlers as All-Stars.

Ross G.L. Harstone Award
The Ross Harstone Award was presented to the player chosen by their fellow peers as the curler who best represented Harstone's high ideals of good sportsmanship, observance of the rules, exemplary conduct and curling ability.

References

Line scores - Ottawa Citizen, pg 22 March 12, 1979 
Rosters - Soudog Curling

1979 in Canadian curling
1979
Curling in Ottawa
1979 in Ontario